Melvin Prestidge (November 20, 1928 – January 25, 2011) was an American police officer and television actor. He was known for playing the roles of Lt. Danny Quon in the American detective television series Hawaiian Eye and Jackie-Jackie in the syndicated television series Captain David Grief.

Born in Hawaii, Prestidge worked as a police officer in Los Angeles County, California. He also worked on Warner Bros. sound stages.

References

External links 

Rotten Tomatoes profile

1928 births
2011 deaths
People from Hawaii
Male actors from Hawaii
American male television actors
20th-century American male actors
American police officers
Los Angeles County, California sheriffs